Saab Microwave systems is a Swedish company which was founded in 1956 as Ericsson Microwave Systems. The business was acquired by Saab and renamed in 2006. The main market for the company is in the sensor and electronic warfare field.

Its most important markets today are Europe, South Africa, Australia and the US. Saab has around 12,500 employees. Annual sales amount to around SEK 24 billion, of which research and development account for about 20 per cent of sales.

To adapt to the new conditions in the industry defence industry, Saab has divided operations since 1 January 2010 into five business areas:
Aeronautics
Dynamics
Electronic Defence Systems
Security and Defence Solutions
Support and Services

Notable Products

Erieye - Airborne Early Warning & Control system
ARTHUR - ARTillery HUnting Radar
GIRAFFE - Agile Multi-Beam air defense search radar
PS-05/A - Fighter aircraft radar
HARD 3D (Helicopter and Aeroplane Radar Detection) radar system

External links
Saab Microwave Systems archived at Saab Group website
"Saab in brief" on the Saabgroup website

Defence companies of Sweden
Electronics companies of Sweden
Saab
Ericsson